Hetlem Çapja (born 3 February 1983 in Elbasan) is a retired Albanian professional footballer who played as a midfielder.

Club career
Çapja spend the majority of his club career representing his boyhood club Elbasani, notably winning the Albanian Superliga title in the 2005–06 season. In January 2012, he joined Tërbuni Pukë by signing until the end of 2011–12 season.

He announced his retirement from football on 6 January 2017 after being a free agent for more than two years.

International career
Çapja has represented Albania at under-21 level, making his debut on 29 March 2005 against Greece, match valid for the qualifiers of 2006 UEFA European Under-21 Championship.

Honours
Elbasani

Albanian Superliga: 2005–06
Albanian First Division: 2013–14

References

1983 births
Living people
Footballers from Elbasan
Albanian footballers
Association football midfielders
Albania under-21 international footballers
KF Elbasani players
KF Tirana players
FK Dinamo Tirana players
KS Shkumbini Peqin players
KF Tërbuni Pukë players
KF Gramshi players
KF Luz i Vogël 2008 players
Kategoria Superiore players
Kategoria e Parë players
Kategoria e Dytë players